Phyllis is a feminine given name.

Phyllis may also refer to:


Places
 Phyllis Township, Ontario, Canada
 Phyllis Province, Greece
 Phyllis, Kentucky, United States, an unincorporated community
 Phyllis Lake, Idaho, United States
 Phyllis Bay, Montagu Island, part of the South Sandwich Islands
 556 Phyllis, an asteroid

Transportation
 Phyllis (ship), a British ship that was shipwrecked in 1795
 Fiat Phyllis, a prototype fuel cell-type hydrogen vehicle
 Phyllis, a LCDR Acis class steam locomotive

Other uses
 Phyllis (TV series), a 1970s American sitcom
 Typhoon Phyllis (disambiguation)
 Phyllis (plant), a genus of plants in the family Rubiaceae

See also
 Phillis